

Description 

The Town of Crestone is a Statutory Town in Saguache County, Colorado.  According to the 2020 United States Census the town population was 141. Crestone is located at the foot of the western slope of the Sangre de Cristo Range, in the northern part of the San Luis Valley. Crestone was platted in 1880 by George Adams, owner of the neighboring Luis Maria Baca Grant No. 4.  In the 1970s the Baca Grande land development, was established on the lands of the Baca Grant to the south and west.   Several hundred homes have been built there  .

The Crestone area, which includes the Baca Grande and Moffat, Colorado, is a spiritual center for some religions, including: a Hindu temple, a Zen center, several Tibetan Buddhist centers, and miscellaneous New Age happenings. Much of this spiritual development was catalyzed by the couple Hanne Strong and Maurice Strong in the 1970s, who set out to make it an interfaith center.

Crestone is named for the 14,000-foot peaks that lie just east of the town: Crestone Peak and Crestone Needle. The Crestones, as they are known collectively, in turn, took their name from the Spanish word crestón, which, according to Walter Borneman and Lyndon Lampert's book A Climbing Guide to Colorado’s Fourteeners, means: “the top of a cock’s comb”; “the crest of a helmet”; or, in miners’ jargon, “an outcropping of ore”.

History

The first settlement in the Crestone area occurred after the American Civil War with the granting of the Luis Maria Baca Grant No. 4 in 1860 to the heirs of the original Baca Grant at Las Vegas, New Mexico. Title to the grant at Las Vegas was clouded by a second grant of the same land to the residents of Las Vegas, the Bacas having abandoned their grant after the deaths of the founder to a Mexican soldier in 1827 and of his oldest son at the hands of the Navajo in 1835. The Baca heirs were offered alternative lands from the public lands of the United States. The Bacas deeded the land to their attorney, but it soon passed by tax sale to a third party. The ranch headquarters were on Crestone Creek to the southwest of Crestone. The Baca Grant was one of the first large tracts of land to be fenced in the West and in its heyday was the home of prize Hereford cattle.

In addition to ranching, there was some mining in the area to the east and south of Crestone of small shallow iron oxide copper gold ore deposits. In 1880, the town of Crestone was platted by George Adams, the owner of the Baca Grant. In 1900, with the help of Eastern investors, George Adams ignited a minor boom, reopening one of the more promising gold mines and building a railroad spur to the town and the mines along the Range south of town. However, lacking good ore, the boom was short lived. A long period of decline followed.

By 1948, Crestone had declined to its post-war population of 40, mostly retirees and cowboys who worked on the Grant, a nickname for the Baca Grant. Many of the old cabins were used as vacation homes. By 1971, the Baca Grant came into the ownership of a corporation which subdivided a portion of the Grant, creating the Baca Grande, a subdivision originally platted for about 10,000 lots. At great expense, underground utilities were installed and roads built. However, sales lagged and by 1979 the development was considered a liability by the corporation. Maurice Strong, owner of a controlling interest and his fiancée, Hanne Marstrand, visited the development and "fell in love with it". They were inspired to create a world spiritual center and began granting parcels of land to traditional spiritual organizations.

The population gradually began to increase and by 2006 several hundred homes had been built and a number of small spiritual communities had become established. As the Baca Grande contained no provision for business uses, Crestone became the business center of the community and, having enacted a sales tax, was in a position to finance further improvements.

Geography

Crestone is located near the 38th parallel, in the San Luis Valley in south central Colorado. Much of the land near the creek where the main part of the city sits, is well watered in normal times, but during a prolonged drought the creek may dry up and underground water levels may fall.

Access
Saguache County Road T is the main road into Crestone. It is a county road. It is "T" in a series of alphabetically named east-west roads which begin at State Highway 112, the south boundary of Saguache County, which would be Road A, if it were not a state highway. Road T is a through road across the valley, crossing U.S. Highway 285 at Swede's Corners about 6 miles south of Saguache, Colorado but is paved only from Moffat, Colorado east 12.5 miles to Crestone, Colorado. The eastern portion of Road T forms the north boundary of the Baca National Wildlife Refuge.

Public lands
Mountain terrain east of Crestone is managed by the Rio Grande National Forest including part of the Sangre de Cristo Wilderness. Public lands at the foot of the mountains including the forested public land surrounding Crestone is managed by the United States Bureau of Land Management. The combined office of the United States Forest Service and the BLM is in Saguache, Colorado, the county seat.

Demographics

Census data is for the Town of Crestone; most people in the Crestone area live in the Baca Grande, a large land development which lies to the south and west of the town.

The following is derived from the US census and covers only the town itself, thus giving a misleading idea of the area. About half of the homes in Crestone itself are used only on a seasonal basis. The Crestone community is much larger, consisting also of several hundred homes in the Baca Grande subdivision, the surrounding rural area, and the small town of Moffat, Colorado. The Moffat School District NO. 2 operates a public school in Moffat and the Crestone Charter School in Crestone.

As of the census of 2000, there were 73 people, 45 households, and 18 families residing in the town. The racial makeup of the town was 95.9% White, 4.1% from other races. 1.4% of the population were Hispanic or Latino of any race.

There were 45 households, out of which 8.9% had children under the age of 18 living with them, 28.9% were married couples living together, 4.4% had a female householder with no husband present, and 60.0% don't fit into the above categories. 48.9% of all households were made up of individuals, and 6.7% had someone living alone who was 65 years of age or older. The average household size was 1.62 and the average family size was 2.22.

In the town, the population was spread out, with 8.2% under the age of 18, 4.1% from 18 to 24, 23.3% from 25 to 44, 45.2% from 45 to 64, and 19.2% who were 65 years of age or older. The median age was 52 years. For every 100 females there were 102.8 males. For every 100 females age 18 and over, there were 103.0 males.

The median income for a household in the town was $31,250, and the median income for a family was $40,000. Males had a median income of $22,813 versus $27,917 for females. The per capita income for the town was $22,291. There were 18.8% of families and 19.7% of the population living below the poverty line, including no under eighteens and none of those over 64.

Gallery

Spiritual and intellectual centers

Crestone has become internationally known as a locus for a large number of many different religious and spiritual traditions. Accommodation of spiritual pilgrims and eco-tourists is the major industry in Crestone. Crestone's development as a spiritual and intellectual center was initiated by Maurice Strong, a multimillionaire businessman and United Nations Undersecretary, and his wife, Hanne Marstrand Strong. Using land acquired from the corporations Strong controlled they established the Manitou Foundation and Manitou Institute, which, according to its website, "provides and grants and some financial support in Crestone/Baca, Colorado, to qualified religious and spiritual projects." Grants of land from the foundation were made to a number of spiritual and intellectual centers in the area.

Spiritual centers in Crestone:

Intellectual and spiritual centers of historical interest:

Volunteer and community services
Emergency services for the town of Crestone and the Baca Grande are provided by the Crestone Volunteer Fire Dept. and the Baca-Crestone Ambulance Service.

The Crestone End of Life Project provides open-air cremation and end of life support. CEOLP is a non-denominational community-based group promoting informed end-of-life choices and supporting their fulfillment. Cost is modest but is available only to the 1,000 or so people who live in the local community.

Fairs and markets
The Annual San Luis Valley Energy Fair is held in Crestone's town parks over Labor Day weekend each year. The fair features ideas and products that relate to environmental sustainability such as solar power and straw bale construction as well as booths offering food and local products. Crestone hosts an annual Artists Open Studio Tour during the first weekend in October, allowing for visits to the many artist's studios in the area. Food and local products are offered regularly at the Saturday Market which happens in the middle of town in Little Pearl Park every Saturday during the summer. Crestone has a free box which is enthusiastically supported by the community.

Wildlife
Crestone has historically been a deer park; Mule deer are commonly seen grazing in yards in town. Black bears are also common, but usually only at night when they raid apple trees and the dumpsters at the cafes and stores in downtown Crestone. In 2011 a bear with two cubs was frequently seen during the day. This bear, which was generally well-behaved other than raiding trash, was killed by the Colorado Department of Natural Resources following a bear attack on a tethered goat. Local sympathizers complained bitterly the wrong bear had been killed, receiving extensive coverage through Channel 9 in Denver which was distributed nationally by the Associated Press, prompting an investigation of the incident by the Division of Parks and Wildlife and possible re-evaluation of management of bears in mixed rural-urban communities such as Crestone. An internal investigation by the Division of Parks and Wildlife came to the conclusion that the right bear had been shot.

See also

 List of municipalities in Colorado

References

 Portions adapted from the Wikinfo article "Crestone, Colorado"

Further reading
 Harlan, George. Postmarks and Places, either self-published or Golden Bell Press, 1976, trade paperback.
 "A Spiritual Community Takes Root: Crestone, Colorado", article by Jeffery Paine in U.S. News & World Report November 16, 2007
 "For Many a Follower, Sacred Ground in Colorado", The New York Times, January 11, 2008
 History of the Baca Grande
 A study by Colorado College anthropology students about the potential impact of natural gas drilling on Crestone's spiritual communities: Homepage

External links

 Town of Crestone website
 CDOT map of the Town of Crestone
 Saguache County Tourism Information
 CrestoneArtists.com

Towns in Colorado
Towns in Saguache County, Colorado